Opdyke may refer to:

People with the surname
Emerson Opdycke (1830–1884), businessman and Union Army brigadier general
Irene Gut Opdyke (1922–2003), Polish nurse, a Righteous Amongst the Nations
George Opdyke (1805–1880), American entrepreneur, New York City mayor
Neil D. Opdyke (1933–2019), American professor
William Opdyke (born 1950s), American scientist

Places
Opdyke, Illinois
Opdyke West, Texas

See also
Opdycke, a surname